Martín Venancio Gálvez Asún (born 17 July 1962), also known by his nickname Tincho Gálvez, is a Chilean professional former footballer who played as a forward for clubs in Chile, Portugal and Mexico.

Club career
A left-footed forward, as a young player he played for Colegio Calasanz and the La Reina League Team. Next, he joined Universidad de Chile youth system, being a well remembered player and team captain. In Chile, he also played for O'Higgins, Deportes Concepción and Audax Italiano.

Thanks of an Argentine friend of his brother, who had played for Braga, he came to Portugal and joined Vitória Guimarães on loan for nine months in the 1984–85 season. Then he moved to Mexico and played for Cruz Azul and Pumas UNAM. For UNAM, he became the first foreign player after around ten years and won the 1989 CONCACAF Champions' Cup.

International career
He represented Chile at the 1983 Pan American Games in Caracas, Venezuela, scoring a goal versus United States U23.

Post-retirement
Gálvez has worked as coach and director of football academies and coach of the University for Development team.

He has taken part in friendly matches along with historical players of Universidad de Chile such as Cristián Castañeda and Patricio Mardones.

Honours
UNAM
 CONCACAF Champions' Cup: 1989

References

External links
 Martín Gálvez at PlaymakerStats

1962 births
Living people
Footballers from Santiago
Chilean footballers
Chilean expatriate footballers
Chile youth international footballers
Association football forwards
Universidad de Chile footballers
Vitória S.C. players
Cruz Azul footballers
Club Universidad Nacional footballers
O'Higgins F.C. footballers
Deportes Concepción (Chile) footballers
Audax Italiano footballers
Chilean Primera División players
Primeira Liga players
Liga MX players
Primera B de Chile players
Chilean expatriate sportspeople in Portugal
Chilean expatriate sportspeople in Mexico
Expatriate footballers in Portugal
Expatriate footballers in Mexico
Chilean football managers